El Al was established by the Israeli government in . Initially offering a weekly service between Tel Aviv and Paris in 1949, the airline began flying to many European destinations the same year, with services to the United States and South Africa starting in 1951.

El Al flies to 51 destinations in Europe, Asia, Africa and North America. 
Following is a list of airports served by the carrier as part of its scheduled services.

COVID-19 outbreak
On 30 January 2020, El Al suspended flights to Beijing because of the outbreak of COVID-19.

In March 2020 the airline saw reduced demand and cancelled flights to Europe. El Al proposed in early March 2020 to lay off 1 in 6 of its 6,200 employees. Israel has discontinued the entry from some nations of all non-Israelis and mandated that Israelis who return from said nations put themselves into a self-imposed two week quarantine.

On 11 March, El Al suspended 8 in 10 employees, and drastically reduced operations. The remaining employees, who include all pilots, will be paid 20% less.

Destinations

See also
Transport in Israel

References

Lists of airline destinations